The Wedding Hotel is a 1944 German comedy film directed by Carl Boese and starring Karin Hardt, René Deltgen and Walter Janssen. Due to Allied bombing raids on German cities like Berlin, much of the film was shot around Kitzbühel in Tyrol. It was one of a number of light-hearted German films made in the final year of the Third Reich.

Synopsis
A group of artists and journalists enjoy a series of romantic entanglements in a country hotel. An author, Vera von Eichberg "of whom no photo exists," has mentioned the hotel in her work, increasing its clientele. When another female guest arrives, everyone assumes she is the author, despite her repeated assertions to the contrary.

Main cast
 Karin Hardt as Brigitte Elling, Verkäuferin
 René Deltgen as Viktor Hoffmann, Pressephotograph
 Walter Janssen as Burgmüller, Schriftsteller
 Ernst Waldow as Alexander, sein Sekretär
 Hermann Pfeiffer as Dr. Wolter, Burgmüllers Verleger
 Hans Hermann Schaufuß as Rupp, Chef eines Pressedienstes
 Georg Vogelsang as Nepomuk Balg, Amtsvorsteher
 Helmuth Helsig as Hacke, Kriminalkommissar
 Edwin Jürgensen as Berendt, Juwelier
 Roma Bahn as Frau Berendt
 Hans Fidesser as Geschäftsführer im "Seehotel"
 Ernst Sattler as Portier im "Seehotel"
 Franz Weber as Knauer, Herausgeber einer Provinzzeitung

References

Bibliography 
 Kreimeier, Klaus. The Ufa Story: A History of Germany's Greatest Film Company, 1918–1945. University of California Press, 1999.

External links 
 

1944 films
1944 comedy films
German comedy films
Films of Nazi Germany
1940s German-language films
German black-and-white films
Films directed by Carl Boese
Films shot in Austria
Films set in hotels
UFA GmbH films
1940s German films